Peblephaeus decoloratus is a species of beetle in the family Cerambycidae. It was described by Bernhard Schwarzer in 1925, originally under the genus Blepephaeus.

Subspecies
 Peblephaeus decoloratus decoloratus (Schwarzer, 1925)
 Peblephaeus decoloratus yonagunii (Breuning & Ohbayashi, 1966)

References

Lamiini
Beetles described in 1925